Louise-Françoise Contat (16 June 1760 – 9 March 1813) was a French actress.

Biography 
She was born in Paris and made her debut at the Comédie Française in 1766 as Atalide in Bajazet. It was in comedy, however, that she made her first success, as Suzanne in Beaumarchais's Mariage de Figaro; and in several minor character parts, which she raised to the first importance, and as the soubrette in the plays of Molière and Pierre de Marivaux, she found opportunities exactly fitted to her talents.

By Louis Marie Jacques Amalric, comte de Narbonne-Lara (17, 23 or 24 August 1755 – 17 November 1813), soldier and diplomat, she had one daughter Louise Amalrique Bathilde Isidore Contat de Narbonne-Lara, born at Saint Pierre de Chaillot, Paris, on 21 September 1788, who married in Paris on 2 December 1811 Dutch Jan Frederik Abbema, born in Amsterdam on 13 June 1773, and had one son Émile, vicomte d' Abbéma, who had an only daughter by his wife Henriette Anne d'Astoin named Louise Abbéma (Étampes, 30 October 1853 – Paris, 4 August 1927).

Bouillet writes of her "She played comedy to perfection and made people remark on the flexibility of her talent, succeeding equally as grandes coquettes and as soubrettes". She was part of the success of the plays of Marivaux and Beaumarchais. She left the theatre in 1808, and in 1809 married de Parny, nephew of the poet Évariste de Parny.

Her sister Marie Émilie Contat (1769–1846), an admirable soubrette, especially as the pert servant drawn by Molière and de Regnard, made her debut in 1784, and retired, in 1815.

See also 
 Troupe of the Comédie-Française in 1790

References

External links 
Louise Contat and her rôles on CESAR

Actresses from Paris
1760 births
1813 deaths
18th-century French actresses
French stage actresses
Sociétaires of the Comédie-Française
Burials at Père Lachaise Cemetery